Jim Lynch (born ) is a Canadian retired professional ice hockey player and coach who played for Fife Flyers, Murrayfield Racers, Solihull Barons, Humberside Seahawks and coached Ayr Scottish Eagles in the United Kingdom.

He was inducted to the British Ice Hockey Hall of Fame in 2001.

Career statistics

Player

Grand Slam
Jim Lynch was coach of the grand slam winning Ayr Scottish Eagles Icehockey club in the 1997-1998 season where they went on to win all four major UK ice hockey trophies. These were: 
 British Championship
 Ice Hockey Superleague
 Benson and Hedges Cup
 Express Cup

References
British Ice Hockey Hall of Fame entry

See also
 Ayr Scottish Eagles

1953 births
British Ice Hockey Hall of Fame inductees
Fife Flyers players
Living people
Murrayfield Racers players
Canadian ice hockey forwards
Canadian expatriate ice hockey players in Scotland
Canadian ice hockey coaches
Ice hockey people from Toronto
Naturalised citizens of the United Kingdom